Robert Clark (1905–1984) was a Scottish film executive best known for being head of production at Associated British Picture Corporation in the late 1940s and 1950s. It was a successful time for the company, films including The Dam Busters (1955).

Among Clark's achievements were negotiating a contract with Warner Bros and signing Audrey Hepburn and Richard Todd to long-term contracts before they were stars. He also financed early films of J. Lee Thompson and Michael Anderson.

In 1949 he announced ABPC would make ten films at a total cost of £2 million. He was heavily reliant on the choices of his scenario director, Frederick Gotfurt. Clark lost nearly £530,000 on production in his first two years in charge and recouped only £330,000 in distribution. He reduced production costs by remaking old company properties, co-financing with the NFFC and going into co productions.

According to writers Sue Harper and Vince Porter, the films which Clark had the most personal interest were The Dam Busters (1955), The Good Companions (1957) and The Moonraker (1958). He was removed from his position as head of production in January 1958 after a series of clashes with Warner Bros and was replaced with C.J. Latta. Following his removal as Director of Production at Elstree Studios, Clark was appointed Chief Executive and Deputy Chairman of ABPC, a position he retained until the takeover of the group by EMI in 1969, a move fiercely opposed by Clark and most fellow directors.

Robert Clark also acquired a majority shareholding in the Inverness-based Caledonian Associated Cinemas Ltd, Scotland's biggest exhibition chain, and remained Chairman of this group until his death.

Select films under Clark's regime
The Hasty Heart (1949)
Happy Go Lovely (1950)
Last Holiday (1950)
Portrait of Clare (1950)
The Franchise Affair (1950)
Angels One Five (1951)
Young Wives' Tale (1951)
The Woman's Angle (1952)
The Yellow Balloon (1952)
Father's Doing Fine (1952)
Knave of Hearts (1954)
The Weak and the Wicked (1954)
It's Great to be Young (1956)
Chase a Crooked Shadow (1958)
Ice Cold in Alex (1958)

References

External links

1905 births
1984 deaths
Scottish film people